The 2015–16 FC Ingolstadt 04 season was the 12th season in the club's history and their first in the Bundesliga.

Events
Media Markt became the shirt sponsor on 3 May 2015, signing a three-year deal.

Transfers

In

Out

Friendlies

Bundesliga

League table

Results summary

Bundesliga fixtures & results

DFB–Pokal

Player information

|-
|colspan="10"|Players who left the club during the 2015–16 season
|-

|}

Notes
1.Kickoff time in Central European Time/Central European Summer Time.
2.FC Ingolstadt 04's goals first.

References

FC Ingolstadt 04 seasons
Ingolstadt 04